Charles Duncan (8 June 1865 – 6 July 1933) was a British Labour Party politician and trade unionist. He was General Secretary of the Workers' Union from 1900 to 1929. He was Member of Parliament for Barrow-in-Furness from 1906 to 1918, and Member of Parliament for Clay Cross from 1922 to 1933 (his death).

Early life
Duncan was born on 8 June 1865 in Middlesbrough, England. He was the son of a ship's pilot. He was apprenticed to the engineering industry, and Elswick Ordnance Factory, Newcastle upon Tyne.

Career

Trade unionism
Duncan joined Amalgamated Society of Engineers, and was active in the trade union movement for the rest of his life.

When the Workers Union was founded in 1898 by Tom Mann, Duncan was its first president. In 1900 he was elected secretary of the union, an office he held until 1929. In that year the Workers Union was merged into the Transport and General Workers' Union.

He was honorary president of the National Union of Police and Prison Officers which existed between 1913 and 1918. The police strikes in 1918 and 1919 resulted in the Police Act 1919 which banned police from joining a trade union and from striking.

Political career
Duncan began his political career as a local councillor. He was a member of Middlesbrough's town council from 1896 to 1900.

He was elected at the 1906 general election as Member of Parliament (MP) for Barrow-in-Furness. During this period, he served as a whip. He earned the nickname 'Angel of Death' in World War I, because he toured the UK encouraging men to join the military; many of those would have died in the trenches. He held the seat until his narrow defeat at the 1918 general election by the Coalition Conservative candidate.

Duncan attempted unsuccessfully to re-enter the Commons when two by-elections were held in The Wrekin, Shropshire, in quick succession in February and November 1920.

At the 1922 election, he stood in the Derbyshire mining constituency of Clay Cross, winning the seat by a large majority from a divided Liberal Party.  He was re-elected at the next four general elections, holding the seat until his death.

Death
Duncan had been ill for a number of months, suffering from an illness of the stomach. He died at the Manor House Hospital, Hampstead, London in July 1933. He was aged 68.

References

External links 
 

1865 births
1933 deaths
Labour Party (UK) MPs for English constituencies
UK MPs 1906–1910
UK MPs 1910
UK MPs 1910–1918
UK MPs 1922–1923
UK MPs 1923–1924
UK MPs 1924–1929
UK MPs 1929–1931
UK MPs 1931–1935
British trade union leaders
Amalgamated Engineering Union-sponsored MPs
Transport and General Workers' Union-sponsored MPs
Workers' Union-sponsored MPs